The Royal Carriages Museum is located at the Citadel in Cairo, Egypt, in front of Suleiman Pasha Mosque. The museum was inaugurated in 1983, then it was re-inaugurated after its renovation in 2013. Further restoration took place from 2017 and the museum was reopened again in 2021. It houses a collection of unique Royal Carriages attributed to different historical periods, from the reign of Khedive Ismail until the reign of King Farouk, in addition to other collection of unique antiques related to the carriages.

References

Museums in Cairo
Carriage museums
Museums established in 1983
1983 establishments in Egypt